Gunnar Andrén (born 9 January 1946, in Eksjö), is a Swedish Liberal People's Party politician, member of the Riksdag since 2002.

References

1946 births
Living people
Members of the Riksdag 2002–2006
Members of the Riksdag 2006–2010
Members of the Riksdag from the Liberals (Sweden)
People from Eksjö Municipality